Tashi is an Australian animated television series based on a series of Tashi books by mother and daughter Anna Fienberg and Barbara Fienberg and illustrated by Kim Gamble. It first screened on 7TWO in 2015 and was repeated on the ABC.

Plot
Tashi's distant cousin Jack has been sent to stay with him. With the help of creature-whisperer Lotus Blossom, they encounter wild adventures filled with giants, ghosts, witches, bandits, demons and dragons.

Characters
Tashi (voiced by James Buckingham)
Jack (voiced by Leon Williams)
Lotus Blossom (voiced by Jacqueline Marriott)

International
Tashi has also screened in Germany, France, Belgium, The Netherlands, UK and Ireland.

Awards

 Nominated for "Most Outstanding Children's Program" at the 2015 Logie Awards (Australia)
 Nominated for "Best Children's Television Program" at the SPA Awards (Australia)
 Nominated for "Tricks For Kids" category at the Stuttgart Festival of Animated Film (Germany)
 Nominated for "Best Animation Series" at the AEAF Awards (Australia)

Notes

References

External links

Tashi on 7plus
Australian Television Information Archive

7two original programming
2014 Australian television series debuts
2015 Australian television series endings
2010s Australian animated television series
Animated television series about children
Australian children's animated television series
Australian computer-animated television series
Australian television shows based on children's books